Highbury is a suburb of Palmerston North, New Zealand. The suburb is located northwest of Palmerston North Central (CBD). The area has the characteristics of a suburban area and had a resident population of 4,886 (2018).

Highbury's street name themes range from British place-names (Brighton, Somerset, Lancaster, Coventry, Brentwood) to those of settlers of Palmerston North (Monrad).

There are many parks and reserves.

Three schools service the area: Somerset Crescent, Takaro, and Monrad Intermediate Schools. The main campus in Palmerston North of Te Wananga o Aotearoa.

The Cloverlea Tavern on the corner of Gillespies Line and Tremaine Avenue is the local pub. The convenience store 'Highbury Shops' is located on the corner of Highbury Avenue and Pembroke Street.

The Monrad Rest Home is located in Highbury.

Westbrook is a nearby suburb.

Demographics

It had a population of 4,866 at the 2018 New Zealand census, an increase of 492 people (11.2%) since the 2013 census, and an increase of 261 people (5.7%) since the 2006 census. There were 1,752 households. There were 2,292 males and 2,571 females, giving a sex ratio of 0.89 males per female, with 1,131 people (23.2%) aged under 15 years, 993 (20.4%) aged 15 to 29, 1,857 (38.2%) aged 30 to 64, and 879 (18.1%) aged 65 or older.

Ethnicities were 65.2% European/Pākehā, 31.7% Māori, 11.8% Pacific peoples, 9.0% Asian, and 2.0% other ethnicities (totals add to more than 100% since people could identify with multiple ethnicities).

The proportion of people born overseas was 16.3%, compared with 27.1% nationally.

Although some people objected to giving their religion, 46.0% had no religion, 37.2% were Christian, 1.4% were Hindu, 2.5% were Muslim, 0.4% were Buddhist and 4.9% had other religions.

Of those at least 15 years old, 399 (10.7%) people had a bachelor or higher degree, and 1,035 (27.7%) people had no formal qualifications. The employment status of those at least 15 was that 1,500 (40.2%) people were employed full-time, 465 (12.4%) were part-time, and 240 (6.4%) were unemployed.

Parks and Reserves
 Monrad Park
 Takaro Park
 Opie Reserve
 Marriner Reserve
 Part of the Kawau Stream Reserve
 Tui Reserve
 Pembroke Reserve
 Oriana Reserve
 Farnham Reserve

Local Government Representation
Highbury is part of the Takaro Ward.

Central Government Representation
General
Highbury is within the boundaries of Palmerston North electorate.

Māori
Highbury is part of Te Tai Hauāuru electorate.

References

Suburbs of Palmerston North
Populated places in Manawatū-Whanganui